Tarikeh-ye Rangrazan (also Romanized as Tārīkeh-ye Rangrazān; also known as Taḩrīkeh) is a village in Itivand-e Jonubi Rural District, Kakavand District, Delfan County, Lorestan Province, Iran. At the 2006 census, its population was 94, in 21 families.

References 

Towns and villages in Delfan County